Klesiv is an urban-type settlement in Sarny Raion (district) of Rivne Oblast (province) in western Ukraine. Population:

History 
Klesiv was first founded in the beginning of the 20th century. It was a settlement in the Volhynian Governorate of the Russian Empire.

In the Second Polish Republic Klesów was part of Volhynian Voivodeship. After the Soviet annexation of Western Ukraine, Klesiv acquired the status of an urban-type settlement in 1940.

Since July 1941 until January 1944 it was occupied by Axis troops.

In January 1989 the population was 5107 people.

In 2013 the population was 4639 people.

Amber
There are placer deposits of amber near Klesiv.

See also
 Stepan, the other urban-type settlement in Sarny Raion of Rivne Oblast

References

Urban-type settlements in Sarny Raion
Populated places established in the 1900s